Alicia Giustiniani was the Dogaressa of Venice by marriage to the Doge Francesco Donato (r. 1545–1553).

As dogaressa, she, as well as her predecessor Maria Pasqualigo, did what she could to support arts and crafts in Venice. One of her acts was redecorating the apartments of Doge's Palace. Giustiniani was foremost known for her work for the glass industry of Murano, which suffered from problems and discontent among the workers between 1547 and 1549.  Giustiniani was the formal protector of the glass guild.  She received their complaints and worked to address them.  In 1550, she used her influence to reintroduce several reforms of the glass industry regulations. Among other things, she restored the permission to travel abroad to glassmakers.

References 
 Staley, Edgcumbe:  The dogaressas of Venice : The wives of the doges, London : T. W. Laurie, 1910

Dogaressas of Venice
Year of birth missing
Year of death missing